Park Ji-yeon (Hangul: 박지연; born April 8, 1981), better known by her stage name Gummy (Hangul: 거미), is a South Korean singer. She debuted in 2003 with the album Like Them and has since become known for her soundtrack appearances.

Career

2003–2009: Debut and breakthrough success
Gummy debuted in 2003 with the album Like Them. Her title track Memory Loss brought her success and recognition and led Gummy to win the Bonsang at the 19th Golden Disk Awards. The same year, Gummy earned the Mobile Popularity Award for Memory Loss at the 2004 Mnet Km Music Festival. However, she suffered vocal nodules between the first and second albums.

She released her fourth album titled Comfort on March 12, 2008, which marked her first released in three years. The lead single I'm Sorry features T.O.P from Big Bang. A week after its release, the song peaked within the top five spots on various digital charts.

2010–2011: Loveless
Gummy released a mini album titled Loveless. A music video plus the full song of one of her tracks in the mini album was released on April 21. Loveless was released on April 29, and promotion for the album began in May.

On October 15, 2011, the MV for her remake of "I'm Sorry" feat. TOP was released.

2013: 10th anniversary and label change
2013 marked the tenth anniversary for Gummy and she celebrated with a fan meeting. She then released her OST for the drama, That Winter, the Wind Blows entitled "Snow Flower".

Gummy also released her second Japanese album, Fate(s). She also had a duet with Daesung from BIGBANG. Two music videos were released for the lead single of the album, "Shinjiteru (Believe)".

Gummy signed with C-JeS Entertainment in October 2013, leaving YG Entertainment.

2014–present: Original soundtrack releases
In 2014, Gummy provided the song "You're Calling Me" for the action-thriller television series Three Days. Gummy then returned with the mini album "I Loved...Have No Regrets". One of the singles from the 6-track EP was a duet with labelmate and JYJ's Park Yuchun.

In 2016, Gummy released her OST for the drama Descendants of the Sun entitled "You are My Everything". It topped iTunes K-pop charts in Canada, Hong Kong, New Zealand, Malaysia, Singapore, Australia, Indonesia, and Taiwan as well as coming in the top 10 in the U.S and Vietnam.  The same year, she once again collaborated with Descendant's music director Gaemi to release the OST for the popular drama Love in the Moonlight entitled "Moonlight Drawn by Clouds". The success of her soundtrack releases drew the media to call her "OST Queen".

In October 2021, Gummy released a ballad titled It Was Still Love.

Personal life
Gummy was born into a food-production family. Her father worked in a seaweed sauce factory, while her grandfather worked in a prawn farm in the sea. She has been in a relationship with actor Jo Jung-suk since 2013.
In June 2018, they announced they would be getting married in the fall. On October 8, 2018, news broke that the couple had gotten married privately. On August 6, 2020, they welcomed their first child.

Discography

Studio albums

Extended plays

Singles

Soundtrack appearances

Other charted songs

Filmography

Television shows

Awards and nominations

Golden Disc Awards

Mnet Asian Music Awards

Other awards

References

External links 
 
 
 

South Korean rhythm and blues singers
Dongduk Women's University alumni
1981 births
Living people
South Korean female idols
YG Entertainment artists
MAMA Award winners
Korean Music Award winners
Melon Music Award winners
21st-century South Korean singers
21st-century South Korean women singers